BackBox is a penetration test and security assessment oriented Ubuntu-based Linux distribution providing a network and informatic systems analysis toolkit. It includes a complete set of tools required for ethical hacking and security testing.

Contents
The main aim of BackBox is providing an alternative, highly customizable and well performing system. BackBox uses the light window manager Xfce.  It delivers a fast, effective, customizable and complete experience. It also has a very helpful community behind it. 

It includes some of the most used security and analysis Linux tools, aiming for a wide spread of goals, ranging from web application analysis to network analysis, from stress tests to sniffing, also including vulnerability assessment, computer forensic analysis and exploitation.

Part of the power of this distribution comes from its Launchpad repository core, constantly updated to the latest stable version of the most known and used ethical hacking tools. The integration and development of new tools in the distribution follows the open source community, particularly the Debian Free Software Guidelines criteria.

Releases

Categories
BackBox Linux categories listed as follow:

Information Gathering
Vulnerability Assessment
Exploitation
Privilege Escalation
Maintaining Access
Documentation & Reporting
Reverse Engineering
Social Engineering
Forensic Analysis
VoIP Analysis
Wireless Analysis
Miscellaneous

Tools
More than 70 tools are included in BackBox:

 Metasploit
 Armitage
 Nmap
 OpenVAS
 W3af
 The Social Engineering Toolkit
 Ettercap
 Scapy
 Wireshark
 Kismet
 Aircrack
 Ophcrack
 Sqlmap
 John The Ripper

References

External links 
 
BackBox Linux on OpenSourceFeed Gallery

Linux security software
Ubuntu derivatives
Debian-based distributions
X86-64 Linux distributions
Operating system distributions bootable from read-only media
Pentesting software toolkits
Linux distributions